Sarab-e-Sureh (also Romanized as Sarāb-e-Sūreh and Sarāb Sūreh; also known as Sarāb-e Sorkh, Sarāb-e Sorkheh, Sarāb Sorkheh, and Sarab Sūra) is a village in Yeylan-e Shomali Rural District, in the Central District of Dehgolan County, Kurdistan Province, Iran. At the 2006 census, its population was 266, in 59 families. The village is populated by Kurds.

References 

Towns and villages in Dehgolan County
Kurdish settlements in Kurdistan Province